Beebe Lake is a lake in Wright County, in the U.S. state of Minnesota.

Beebe Lake was named for an early settler. This lake is 323 acres in size. It is approximately 27 feet deep at its deepest point.

See also
List of lakes in Minnesota

References

Lakes of Minnesota
Lakes of Wright County, Minnesota